The IPSC Shotgun World Shoot is the highest level shotgun match within the International Practical Shooting Confederation (IPSC) and consists of several days and at least 30 separate courses of fire. The Shotgun World Shoots are held triennially on a rotational cycle with the other two main IPSC disciplines Handgun and Rifle.

History 
The first Shotgun World Shoot was held in 2012 in Debrecen, Hungary, and consisted of 30 stages over 5 days and over 400 competitors. The subsequent 2015 Shotgun World Shoot was held at the "Le Tre Piume" shooting range near Agna, Italy. The match had 30 stages over 5 days, and 635 competitors from 30 nations. The 2018 Shotgun World Shoot was held at the National Shooting Center in Châteauroux, France 
and consisted of 30 stages over 7 days, and 656 competitors from 39 nations. The next Shotgun World Shoot has been awarded to Thailand, and will be held in 2021.

List of Shotgun World Shoots 
 2012 Shotgun World Shoot in Debrecen, Hungary
 2015 Shotgun World Shoot in Agna, Italy
 2018 Shotgun World Shoot at the National Shooting Center, Châteauroux, France
 2022 Shotgun World Shoot in Thailand

Individual champions 
The following is a list of previous and current Shotgun World Champions:

Overall Category

Lady Category

Junior Category

Senior Category

Super Senior Category

See also 
 IPSC Handgun World Shoots
 IPSC Rifle World Shoots
 IPSC Action Air World Shoots
 List of world sports championships

References 
IPSC :: Match Results - 2012 Shotgun World Shoot
IPSC :: Match Results - 2015 Shotgun World Shoot

External links 
Promo: 2015 IPSC Shotgun World Shoot, Italy
Shotgun World Shoot II